Rovshan Enver ogly Askerov (born May 4, 1972, in Baku, Azerbaijan SSR) is a Russian journalist, participant in the television game What? Where? When?, former sports columnist for the Sport-Express newspaper.

Biography 
He was born on May 4, 1972, in Baku in the family of the artist Enver Askerov. Graduated from the Faculty of History of Baku State University in 1994, candidate of historical sciences.

In What? Where? When? played for the first time on November 28, 1998. 2001 Winter Series MVP. One of the most scandalous and odious players in the history of the TV show.

From 2001 to 2007, he worked as a columnist for the Sport-Express newspaper, covering competitions in cross-country skiing, fencing, cycling, rhythmic and artistic gymnastics, as well as in some other sports. He worked as a correspondent for the 2004 Summer Olympics and the 2006 Winter Olympics.

Since 2007, he has been a correspondent on the NTV-Plus television channel, where he moved at the invitation of Vasily Utkin. He worked on a football channel, and also commented on competitions in ski jumping and Nordic combined.

Askerov left Russia after his statements about the conduct of Georgy Zhukov in World War II were deemed to be offensive.  Askerov maintained that he was telling the truth.

References

External links 

 

1972 births
Living people
People from Baku
Russian game show hosts
Russian television presenters
Baku State University alumni
20th-century Russian historians
21st-century Russian historians
20th-century Azerbaijani historians
21st-century Azerbaijani historians
Azerbaijani television presenters
Russian sports journalists
Russian people of Azerbaijani descent
Journalists from Baku
Russian columnists

Russian activists against the 2022 Russian invasion of Ukraine